Vineta Pētersone (born 21 May 1999) is a Latvian BMX cyclist.

Personal life
She has competed in cross-country skiing at national level and junior international level. Her older brother Arnis Petersons has competed in cross-country mountain biking at the World Championships, and also represented Latvia in biathlon at the 2012 Winter Youth Olympic Games in Innsbruck, Austria.

Career
She was selected in the Latvian team for the Cycling at the 2020 Summer Olympics – Women's BMX racing.

References

External links
 
 
 
 

1999 births
Living people
BMX riders
Latvian female cyclists
Latvian female cross-country skiers
Olympic cyclists of Latvia
Cyclists at the 2020 Summer Olympics
People from Cēsis
21st-century Latvian women